Stanmore station could refer to either:

 Stanmore tube station, London
 Stanmore Village railway station, England (now closed)
 Stanmore railway station, Sydney